Carl Borack (born July 12, 1947) is an American former fencer. He competed in the individual and team foil events at the 1972 Summer Olympics. He won a gold medal in epee at the 1967 Pan American Games. In 1969 he won the US national foil championship, and in Israel the 1969 Maccabiah Games sabre championship. He won a gold medal in foil at the 1971 Pan American Games.  He is Jewish, and in 1990 he was inducted into the Southern California Jewish Sports Hall of Fame.

He is also a producer, photographer with works on display with the Art of the Olympians.

References

External links
 

1947 births
Living people
American male foil fencers
American male épée fencers
American male sabre fencers
Jewish male foil fencers
Jewish male épée fencers
Jewish male sabre fencers
Jewish American sportspeople
Olympic fencers of the United States
Competitors at the 1969 Maccabiah Games
Maccabiah Games medalists in fencing
Maccabiah Games gold medalists for the United States
Fencers at the 1972 Summer Olympics
Sportspeople from Staten Island
Pan American Games medalists in fencing
Pan American Games gold medalists for the United States
Fencers at the 1967 Pan American Games
Fencers at the 1971 Pan American Games
Medalists at the 1967 Pan American Games
Medalists at the 1971 Pan American Games